The Soul Bowl is an American college football rivalry between Jackson State and Alcorn State. Mississippi's two largest historically black colleges and universities have played over 80 times in the game dating back to the late 1920s. The game has carried the unofficial moniker "the Soul Bowl" since the late 1970s. JSU currently holds a 48-37-2 lead in the series which has included some of the greatest names in college football. From 1993 to 2011, the game was dubbed the "Capital City Classic" and held in Jackson annually before it was moved to an alternating schedule between Jackson and Lorman in 2012. During the 2020 season, Alcorn State, after choosing to forgo its season, the SWAC ruled that all their scheduled games would result in forfeits.

Results

(All games listed in Jackson, MS were played at Mississippi Veterans Memorial Stadium and all games listed in Lorman, MS were played at Casem-Spinks Stadium unless otherwise noted)

References

College football rivalries in the United States
Jackson State Tigers football
Alcorn State Braves football